Michał Drzymała (13 September 1857 – 25 April 1937) was a Polish peasant living in the Greater Poland region (or the Grand Duchy of Posen) under Prussian rule. He is a Polish folk hero because, after he was denied permission to build a house on his own land (he was Polish and opposed to Germanization) by the Prussian authorities in the village of Kaisertreu, he bought a circus wagon and turned it into his home. At the time, Prussian law considered any dwelling a house if it remained stationary for more than 24 hours. Drzymała used the mobility of the wagon to exploit the law and to avoid the negative consequences by moving the wagon each day and thus preventing the Prussians the ability to penalize him.  His dwelling became known as Drzymała's wagon (Wóz Drzymały), and gained notoriety when this case was described by the Polish and European newspapers, making fun of the Prussian state, and energizing the Poles living under the Prussian authority against it.

External links 

 Michał Drzymała : A Bibliography by LitDok East-Central Europe / Herder-Institut (Marburg)

19th-century Polish people
20th-century Polish people
Polish independence activists
People from the Province of Posen
People from Grodzisk Wielkopolski
1857 births
1937 deaths
Serfs